Lingeigh or Lingay is an unpopulated islet in the Outer Hebrides. There is a cave on the southeast side of the island.

Notes and references

Barra Isles
Uninhabited islands of the Outer Hebrides